Karolina Szabó (born November 17, 1961) is a retired Hungarian athlete, who specialized in the long-distance running events. Born in Dunaföldvár, Tolna, she represented Hungary in the marathon at the 1988 Seoul Olympics, finishing 13th, and the 1992 Barcelona Olympics, finishing 11th.

Szabo won the City-Pier-City Loop half marathon in the Hague in 1987.
On 23 April 1988 in Budapest, she broke the 25,000 metres world record on the track with 1:29:29.2, en route to also breaking the 30,000 metres world record with 1:47:05.6. She also won the 1991 Munich Marathon and the 1994 San Francisco Marathon.

Personal best
Marathon — 2:30:31 (1986)

Achievements

References

1961 births
Living people
Hungarian female long-distance runners
Athletes (track and field) at the 1988 Summer Olympics
Athletes (track and field) at the 1992 Summer Olympics
Olympic athletes of Hungary
Hungarian female marathon runners
People from Dunaföldvár
Sportspeople from Tolna County